Talang 2019 was the ninth season of Swedish Talang and was broadcast on TV4 between 11 January 2019 and 15 March 2019. Presenters for this season are Pär Lernström along with Samir Badran, the jury consists of Alexander Bard, David Batra, Bianca Ingrosso and LaGaylia Frazier. Winner of this season what singer Micke Holm.

Semifinals

Semi-final 1 (1 March 2019)

Semi-final 2 (8 March 2019)

Grand Final (15 March 2019)

References

Talang (Swedish TV series)